Julien Aklei (born November 20, 1975 in Philadelphia, Pennsylvania) is an American singer-songwriter, guitarist and artist.

Aklei was raised in Louisville, Kentucky where she graduated as a National Merit Scholar from Kentucky Country Day School in 1994 and went on to the University of Virginia as an Echols Scholar.

The Washington Post referred to Aklei as an "eerie-intriguing singer-songwriter" with a "haunting voice and a strangely tough-vulnerable stage presence."

Her work is characterized by deeply personal and otherworldly lyrics, and an emphasis on her voice over the music. Although she accompanies herself on several different instruments – including piano – her style of electric guitar and vocals are the linchpins of her sound. Aklei has experimented widely with differing music styles, including folk, jazz, rockabilly, and blues throughout a varied career.

Blog Released Singles

Julien Aklei is a prolific songwriter with over 200 recorded and published songs, which are available as singles released from her website in blog format.

Discography
2003 We Can Mate With Rabbits
2004 I Conquered while still in the Egg
2006 Pink Star of the Beautiful Ohio
2006 Coffee for My Captain
2006 The Odyssey
2006 New Friends
2007 Fun for Fairies!
2008 Savage Life

References
Washington Post Review

Notes

External links
Julien Aklei official website

1975 births
Psychedelic folk musicians
American country guitarists
American women singer-songwriters
American folk guitarists
American folk singers
American rock guitarists
American women country singers
American country singer-songwriters
American country rock singers
Living people
Musicians from Louisville, Kentucky
Rock musicians from Kentucky
Country musicians from Kentucky
Folk musicians from Kentucky
Singer-songwriters from Kentucky
Singer-songwriters from Pennsylvania
Guitarists from Kentucky
Guitarists from Philadelphia
21st-century American women singers
21st-century American singers
Country musicians from Pennsylvania
21st-century American women guitarists
21st-century American guitarists